Auditory science or hearing science is a field of research and education concerning the perception of sounds by humans, animals, or machines. It is a heavily interdisciplinary field at the crossroad between acoustics, neuroscience, and psychology. It is often related to one or many of these other fields: psychophysics, psychoacoustics, audiology, physiology, otorhinolaryngology, speech science, automatic speech recognition, music psychology, linguistics, and psycholinguistics.

History 

Early auditory research included the early 19th century work of Georg Ohm and August Seebeck and their experiments and arguments about Fourier analysis of sounds.  Later in the 19th century, German physicist Hermann von Helmholtz wrote Sensations of Tone describing the founding concepts of psychoacoustics, i.e. the relationship between the physical parameters of a sound and the percept that it induces.

Psychoacoutics is primarily interested in the basic workings of the ear and is, therefore, mostly studied using simple sounds like pure tones. In the 1950s, psychologists George A. Miller and J. C. R. Licklider furthered our knowledge in psychoacoustics and speech perception.

Main scientific journals 

 Acoustical Science and Technology
 Acta Acustica united with Acustica
 Audiology & Neurotology
 Cochlear Implants International
 Ear and Hearing
 Frontiers in Auditory Cognitive Neuroscience
 Hearing Research
 IEEE/ACM Transactions on Audio, Speech, and Language Processing
 International Journal of Audiology (IJA)
 Journal of Speech, Language and Hearing Research
 Journal of the American Academy of Audiology (JAAA)
 Journal of the Association for Research in Otolaryngology (JARO)
 Journal of the Audio Engineering Society
 Music Perception
 Otology & Neurotology
 Speech Communication
 The Journal of the Acoustical Society of America (JASA)
 Trends in Hearing

Scientific associations and societies

International 

 Acoustical Society of America
 Association for Research in Otolaryngology
 European Acoustics Association

National 

 Société Française d'Acoustique (French Acoustical Society)
 Deutsche Gesellschaft für Akustik (German Acoustical Society)
 British Society of Audiology
 Nederlandse Vereniging voor Audiologie (Dutch Association for Audiology)
 Acoustical Society of Japan

Online resources 

Many members of the auditory science community follow the auditory.org mailing list, known as "the Auditory List".

References 

Hearing